Seakatrisauropus is an ichnogenus of reptile footprint.

See also

 List of dinosaur ichnogenera

References

Reptile trace fossils